William Stephenson (19 April 1889 – 19 August 1953) was an English marine engine stoker. He is best known for his service in the Imperial Trans-Antarctic Expedition of 1914–1916.

Career
Stephenson was born on 19 April 1889 in Kingston upon Hull, probably in the suburb of Sculcoates.  He served from 1914 until 1915 as a stoker aboard the Endurance, the exploration vessel built for the Imperial Trans-Antarctic Expedition headed by of Sir Ernest Shackleton. After the vessel sank in late 1915, Stephenson joined the other members of the ship's crew as a castaway and was rescued in August 1916.

Stephenson is one of the lesser-known explorers in Antarctic history. In the words of the Endurance crew's biographer, John F. Mann, "very little is recorded or known about his life, and of the 28 members of the Endurance, he is perhaps the most mysterious."

By 1914, he is believed to have been a veteran of the Royal Marines, who had served as an officer's steward. Possibly before and certainly after his Antarctic service, Stephenson served for many years as a seaman on the fishing trawlers that put out from the Yorkshire coast to the fishing banks of the North Sea.

Despite his sea experience, he occupied a humble space on the Endurance, and few of the diaries and journals kept by his shipmates mention him or flesh out his character.  One tiny fragment of information indicates that although William Stephenson's nickname in civilian life was "Bill", he was known on the Endurance as "Steve".

Press coverage of Stephenson's dramatic rescue from the Antarctic in August 1916 appears to have been confined to the printing of his name on a manifest listing the passengers on a steamboat marking the final stage of their return to England in late 1916.

Personal life 
Stephenson lived in obscurity until his death in hospital in Hull in August 1953.

Legacy
With his fellow fireman-stoker Ernest Holness, William Stephenson was one of four members of the Endurance crew to be denied the Polar Medal. The reasons, if any, for expedition leader Shackleton's failure to recommend Stephenson for this honour are unknown.

References

1889 births
1953 deaths
Imperial Trans-Antarctic Expedition
Seamen from Kingston upon Hull